Andrioniškis is a town in Anykščiai District Municipality, in Utena County, in northeast Lithuania. According to the 2011 census, the town has a population of 229 people. Town established near Šventoji River. Andrioniškis name first time mentioned in 1672.

Domicėlė Tarabildienė, a graphical artist, was born in Andrioniškis in 1912.

References

Towns in Utena County
Towns in Lithuania
Vilkomirsky Uyezd
Anykščiai District Municipality